Jon Ortner (born Jonathan Ortner; 1951 in Great Neck, Long Island, New York) is an American photographer known for his work in the Himalaya Mountains of Nepal, Bhutan, and Ladakh. He has photographed and written extensively about southeast Asia, including Cambodia, Myanmar, Thailand, Laos, Bali, Java, and India. He has most recently photographed in the deserts and canyons of the American West. These photos have been collected in Canyon Wilderness of the Southwest.

Ortner attended University of Kansas, in Lawrence, Kansas, where he studied Photography, Eastern Philosophy, and Systematics and Ecology. At the age of 20 he made his first journey to India and Nepal where experiences in the Himalaya focused the direction of his photography. In 1978, Ortner moved to Manhattan with his wife Martha McGuire where they opened a commercial studio. His assignment photography has been used in advertising and promotion for corporations and real estate developers.

Ortner's photography in Asia has focused on the highest mountains and deepest gorges on earth, and the meditative philosophies of Hinduism and Buddhism that evolved there. He has led expeditions throughout the Himalaya, some for as long as 65 days. Several of them have been documented in Buddha which has won an IPPY and a ForeWord Book Award. Its introduction was written by Jack Kornfield.

His books combine graphic photography with scholarly and informative text. The importance of pilgrimage, symbolic architecture, and the sacred topography of the Himalaya has been a recurrent theme in both his photography and writings.

Ortner's photographs have been shown at the Nikon, Kodak, and Neikrug Galleries in the United States.

Bibliography
 Calendar Girls, 2019, Schiffer Publishing
 Peak of Perfection, Nude Portraits of Dancers, Athletes and Gymnasts 2015 Schiffer Publishing
 Huffington Post Book Review: http://www.huffingtonpost.com/michael-ernest-sweet/photo-book-review-jon-ort_b_7956818.html
 Book Review in ProPhoto Dailey: https://www.ai-ap.com/publications/article/14799/ppd-spotlight-jon-ortners-nude-perfectionism.html
 Canyon Wilderness of the Southwest, Rizzoli Press,
 Buddha (Welcome Books, 2003 978-0-941807-28-9)
 Book Review in Spirituality & Practice: http://www.spiritualityandpractice.com/arts/reviews/view/24530/buddha
 Angkor, Celestial Temples of Khmer Empire (Abbeville Press, 2002 978-0-789207-18-0)
 Japan Times Book Review : https://www.japantimes.co.jp/culture/2003/11/30/books/book-reviews/power-and-glory-of-temple-ruins/#.WzqCXRlJlp8
 Where Every Breath Is A Prayer, A Photographic Pilgrimage into the Spiritual Heart of Asia (Stewart, Tabori & Chang, 1996 978-1-556704-39-0)
 Book Review from Publishers Weekly: https://www.publishersweekly.com/978-1-55670-439-0
 Manhattan Dawn and Dusk (Stewart, Tabori, & Chang 1995 978-1-556704-26-0)

Awards
Communication Arts, Design Award
AIGA Design Award; Hawaii Visitors Bureau, Award for Best Photography
Print Magazine, Regional Design Award
Marsden Grant, Himalayan Research

Media coverage
 National Geographic News, Photographer Showcases Legendary Khmer Temple Preah Vihear
 http://voices.nationalgeographic.com/2009/06/23/preah_vihear/
 Architectural Digest, Adrift in a Mughal Garden, May 1990 p. 90–95
 Architectural Digest, New York Special Issue, November 1992, Cover and Special Edition Poster
 GEO Magazine, Where Every Breath Is A Prayer, March 1982, V4, p. 74–85
 GEO Magazine, What happened to Shangri La, June 1983, V5, p. 24–31
 Natural History Magazine, Sacred and Profane Himalaya, January 1988, p. 26–35
 Print Magazine, Peaks, May/June 1985, p. 78–85
 Travel Holiday Magazine, Sea Spell, September 1991, p. 58–64

External links
 
 Canyon Wilderness of the Southwest
 Buddha

Interviews
 Nikon Online: On the Road Again: Cambodia and Myanmar
 Print Magazine: Peaks

1951 births
American photographers
People from Long Island
University of Kansas alumni
Living people